The Hunter 45 DS and Hunter 45 CC are a family of American sailboats, that was first built in 2005/2006.

The design is often confused with the unrelated 1985 Hunter 45 and Hunter 45 Legend designs.

Production
The boat series was built by Hunter Marine in the United States, but it is now out of production.

Design
The Hunter 45 DS and CC series are both small recreational keelboats, built predominantly of fiberglass.

Variants
Hunter 45 CC (Center Cockpit)
This model was designed by Glenn Henderson and the Hunter Design Team and introduced in 2005. The boat has a PHRF racing average handicap of 84 with a high of 72 and low of 111.

Hunter 45 DS (Deck Salon)
This model was designed by Glen Henderson and introduced in 2006 as updated version of the Hunter 44 DS.

See also
List of sailing boat types

Related development
Hunter 45

Similar sailboats
C&C 45
Hunter 456

References

External links

Keelboats
2000s sailboat type designs
Sailing yachts
Sailboat type designs by Glenn Henderson
Sailboat types built by Hunter Marine